Sârbeşti may refer to several villages in Romania:

 Sârbeşti, a village in Lunca Commune, Bihor County
 Sârbeşti, a village in Vintilă Vodă Commune, Buzău County
 Sârbeşti, a village in Alimpești Commune, Gorj County